On the Old Spanish Trail is a 1947 American Trucolor Western film  starring Roy Rogers and directed by William Witney.

Plot

Cast 
Roy Rogers as Roy Rogers
Trigger as Trigger, the Smartest Horse in the West
Tito Guízar as Rico / The Gypsy
Jane Frazee as Candy Martin
Andy Devine as Constable Cookie Bullfincher
Estelita Rodriguez as Lolita
Charles McGraw as Harry Blaisdell
Fred Graham as Henchman Marcos
Steve Darrell as Henchman Al
Marshall Reed as Henchman Gus
Wheaton Chambers as Oil Co. Clerk Silas MacIntyre
Bob Nolan as Bob
Sons of the Pioneers as Musicians

Soundtrack 
 Tito Guízar - "I'll Never Love Again" based on "La borrachita" (Written by Ignacio Fernández Esperón, English lyrics by Al Stewart)
 Estelita Rodriguez and Tito Guízar - "Guadalajara" (Written by Pepe Guízar)
 Roy Rogers and Jane Frazee - "My Adobe Hacienda" (Written by Louise Massey and Lee Penny)
 Roy Rogers and the Sons of the Pioneers - "On the Old Spanish Trail" (Music by Kenneth Leslie-Smith, lyrics by Jimmy Kennedy)
 Tito Guízar - "Una furtiva lagrima" from the opera L'elisir d'amore (Music by Gaetano Donizetti, libretto by Felice Romani)
 Sons of the Pioneers - "Here Is My Helping Hand" (Written by Bob Nolan)
 "Bolero" (Written by M.H. Sturgis and W.P. Blake)

External links 

1947 films
1947 Western (genre) films
American black-and-white films
Republic Pictures films
American Western (genre) films
Trucolor films
Films directed by William Witney
1940s English-language films
1940s American films